Sergio Marchi may refer to:

 Sergio Marchi (footballer) (1920–1979), Italian footballer
 Sergio Marchi (politician) (born 1956), Canadian politician